The FIBT World Championships 1982 took place in St. Moritz, Switzerland for the record fourteenth time. The Swiss city had hosted the event previously in 1931 (Four-man), 1935 (Four-man), 1937 (Four-man), 1938 (Two-man), 1939 (Two-man), 1947, 1955, 1957, 1959, 1965, 1970, 1974, and 1977. The skeleton event debuted at the championships after being held in St. Moritz at the 1928 and 1948 Winter Olympics and it marked the first time the event took place on the actual bobsleigh track and not on the Cresta Run.

Two man bobsleigh

Four man bobsleigh

Men's skeleton

Medal table

References
2-Man bobsleigh World Champions
4-Man bobsleigh World Champions
FIBT World Skeleton Championship results 1928-2005

1982
1982 in Swiss sport
Sport in St. Moritz
1982 in bobsleigh
International sports competitions hosted by Switzerland
Bobsleigh in Switzerland